Hemimorina is a monotypic moth genus in the family Geometridae. Its only species, Hemimorina dissociata, is found in North America. Both the genus and species were first described by James Halliday McDunnough in 1941.

The MONA or Hodges number for Hemimorina dissociata is 6775.

References

Further reading

 
 
 
 
 
 
 
 
 

Nacophorini
Articles created by Qbugbot
Moths described in 1941
Monotypic moth genera